Al-Qādisiyyah is an area of Kuwait City.

References

Suburbs of Kuwait City
Populated places in Kuwait